American Cheese is the third album by Nerf Herder, released in 2002.

Track listing
All songs written by Parry Gripp, except where indicated.

A track that didn't make it on to the album called "Bark for the bone" was released via Parry Gripp's website as an MP3. In the file info under album it states - "Completely Unauthorized American Cheese Left Over".

Personnel
Parry Gripp – vocals, guitar 
Justin Fisher – bass, vocals
Steve Sherlock – drums, vocals 
Dave Ehrlich – guitar

References

2002 albums
Nerf Herder albums
Honest Don's Records albums